Robert McKasha Mitchell (born February 6, 1856 in Cincinnati, Ohio – died May 1, 1933 in Springfield, Ohio) was a professional baseball pitcher during the 19th century.  Mitchell played for the Cincinnati Reds, Cleveland Blues, and St. Louis Brown Stockings.  He started 44 games during the four seasons of his career, completing 40 of his starts and winning 20 games.

External links

Major League Baseball pitchers
Cincinnati Reds (1876–1879) players
Cleveland Blues (NL) players
St. Louis Brown Stockings (AA) players
19th-century baseball players
Baseball players from Cincinnati
1856 births
1933 deaths
Springfield Champion City players
Rochester (minor league baseball) players
Pottsville Antarcites players
Chambersburg (minor league baseball) players
Hamilton (minor league baseball) players